Escape from Havana is the debut album by rapper Mellow Man Ace. It was released on August 29, 1989 by Capitol Records. Production for the album was contributed by the Dust Brothers, Tony G, Def Jef, DJ Muggs and Johnny Rivers. The album received a positive reception from critics who praised the East Coast and Latin-influenced production and lyricism. Escape from Havana peaked at number 69 on the Billboard 200 and spawned three singles: "Rhyme Fighter", "Mentirosa" and "If You Were Mine".

Critical reception

Escape from Havana garnered positive reviews from music critics who praised the production and lyrics for being a great mix of East Coast and Latin-flavored styles. Alex Henderson of AllMusic praised the album's amalgam of hardcore tracks and mainstream love ballads that showcase Ace's ability as a bilingual rapper, concluding that "Ace, like a lot of rappers, spends too much time boasting about his microphone skills. Nonetheless, Escape From Havana is an individualistic, risk-taking work that's well worth hearing." A writer for People also praised the language duality of Ace's lyrical flow, noting his Spanish delivery as being the better language, concluding with, "But it's when he drops into the loving tongue that his music becomes truly distinctive and exciting. Muy bien, Mellow Man." In a retrospective review, Matt Jost of RapReviews said that despite following late '80s hip-hop trends he praised Tony G and the Dust Brothers for their creative use of samples and Ace's lyrical delivery for crafting an album that's less exploitive of Latin culture and more inventive in its given genre, saying that "Pop or hip-hop, Mellow Man Ace was willing (and able) to cater to almost everyone except the gangsta segment. He could pen love songs, he could take a lyrical approach, he could be goofy, he could battle, and he managed to find different forms of expression depending on theme or track."

Track listing

Notes
"If You Were Mine" features uncredited vocals by Sen Dog.

Samples

"Hip Hop Creature"
"Tom Sawyer" by Rush
"Sister Sanctified" by Stanley Turrentine and Milt Jackson
"Mentirosa"
"Evil Ways" and "No One to Depend On" by Santana
"Rhyme Fighter"
"Galaxy" by War
"Let a Woman Be a Woman" by Dyke and the Blazers
"Get Up, Get into It, Get Involved" by James Brown
"Eazy-Duz-It" by Eazy-E
"If You Were Mine"
"Summer Madness" by Kool and the Gang
"River Cubano"
"Funky Drummer" and "Escape-ism" by James Brown
"Pump That Bass" by Original Concept

"Mas Pingon"
"Good Old Music" by Funkadelic
"Gettin' Stupid"
"Sing a Simple Song" by Sly and the Family Stone
"Talkapella"
"If You've Got It, You'll Get It" by The Headhunters
"Beat Bop" by Rammelzee and K-Rob
"Sucker M.C.'s" by Run-DMC
"B-Boy in Love"
"Groove with You" by The Isley Brothers
"Sweet Thing" by Rufus featuring Chaka Khan
"En La Casa"
"Rock with You" by Michael Jackson
"The Bottle" by Gil-Scott Heron and Brian Jackson
"Roadblock" by Stock Aitken Waterman
"Maceo" by Maceo and All the King's Men

Charts

References

1989 debut albums
Mellow Man Ace albums
Capitol Records albums
Albums produced by Def Jef
Albums produced by DJ Muggs
Albums produced by the Dust Brothers